Mihai Baicu (21 September 1975 – 6 July 2009) was a Romanian professional footballer who played as a midfielder for Naţional București, Brăila, Gloria IRIS Coreşti, Argeş Piteşti, Târgovişte, Foresta Suceava, Cittadella, Cremonese, Braşov, FC Ghimbav, Farul Constanţa and Ceahlăul Piatra Neamţ. Baicu died on 6 July 2009, at the age of 33.

References

1975 births
2009 deaths
Romanian footballers
Romanian expatriate footballers
AFC Dacia Unirea Brăila players
FC Progresul București players
FC Argeș Pitești players
A.S. Cittadella players
U.S. Cremonese players
FC Brașov (1936) players
FCV Farul Constanța players
CSM Ceahlăul Piatra Neamț players
Liga I players
Serie B players
Expatriate footballers in Italy
Association football midfielders